HD 134064 is a binary star system in the northern constellation of Boötes. The pair are separated by a distance of around 8,000 AU.

References

External links
 HR 5633
 CCDM J15073+1827
 Image HD 134064

Boötes
134064
Binary stars
074000
A-type main-sequence stars
5633
Durchmusterung objects
NGC objects